112 Sul is a Federal District Metro brazilian station on Orange and Green lines. It was opened on 9 May 2009 and added to the already operating section of the line, from Central to Terminal Samambaia and Terminal Ceilândia. It is located between 110 Sul and 114 Sul.

References

Brasília Metro stations
2009 establishments in Brazil
Railway stations opened in 2009